Frank Whitman may refer to:
 Frank Whitman (baseball), Major League Baseball player
 Frank Perkins Whitman, American physicist 
 Frank M. Whitman, American Union Army soldier and Medal of Honor recipient